Columbus Towers or Torres de Colón is a highrise office building composed of twin towers located at the Plaza de Colón in Madrid, Spain. The building constructed in 1976 was designed by the architect Antonio Lamela.

The building with its 116-meter height and 23 floors is the twelfth-tallest in the Spanish capital (counting the CTBA towers). It was the headquarters of the Rumasa company, during which time its name was changed to Torres de Jerez (Towers of Jerez), in honour of the home town of the company. It is currently valued at $116 million. 

It is found in and dominates the Plaza de Colón, one of the major commercial centres in Madrid. The twin buildings are known locally as "El Enchufe" or "The Plug" for the plug-like structure that binds them.

The towers have a suspended structure; the building consists of two pillars together on top of a platform from which hang two large towers with perimeter beams six feet singing with pendulums each floor with cable-stayed steel cables. Construction commenced with the concrete footings, the two central pillars and the upper platform. Then the towers were built from top to bottom, from the upper platform plant to plant closer to the base of the building. At the base, three floors (six floors including basements) were built from the bottom up.

The glass facades are covered with maroon and green and there is a structure (the 'plug' added later) at the top. The building houses offices of various companies and shops on the lower floors.

References

Skyscraper office buildings in Madrid
Office buildings completed in 1976
Twin towers
Buildings and structures in Almagro neighborhood, Madrid